The Carmine Castle was a castle in Naples, Italy. It was one of the fortifications built by the Spaniards under viceroy Pedro Álvarez de Toledo in the mid-16th century as part of the Spanish plans to surround the city with walls and forts. It stood at what was then the south-east corner of the walled city, that wall then turning in to the north. The fortress had great strategic value in the military history of the city up to and including the defense of the Neapolitan Republic of 1799 against the returning royalist forces of king Ferdinand IV. In order to make room for a modern road along the sea and the port of Naples, the fortress/castle was demolished in 1900 as part of the great urban renewal of Naples of that period. Two towers and fragmentary ruins still stand as historic markers.

Castles in Naples
16th-century establishments in Italy